Thyas metaphaea is a moth of the family Noctuidae first described by George Hampson in 1913. It is found in Africa, including Nigeria.

References

Ophiusina
Insects of West Africa
Moths of Africa